Eucereon obscura is a moth of the subfamily Arctiinae. It was described by Heinrich Benno Möschler in 1872. It is found in Mexico, Costa Rica, Panama, Ecuador and the Amazon region.

References

obscura
Moths described in 1872